"Elephant" is a song by Polish singer Margaret. It was included on the reissue of her debut studio album, Add the Blonde (2014), released in 2016. The song was written by Margaret, Joakim Buddee, and Thomas Karlsson, and produced by Buddee. It was released as a single on 27 August 2016, only in Poland.

"Elephant" reached number 21 on the Polish Airplay Chart.

Music video
The song's music video premiered on Margaret's official mobile app on 13 September 2016. It was uploaded to her official YouTube channel a day later. The video was directed by Bogna Kowalczyk.

Critical reception
Mike Wass of Idolator called the song's chorus "catchy as hell" and wrote that even though its "sound isn't entirely original, there's something about Margaret's accent combined with the oddball lyrics that is utterly charming."

Live performances
Margaret performed Elephant for the first time at the Eska Music Awards on 26 August 2016.

Track listing

Charts

Weekly charts

Release history

References

2016 singles
2016 songs
Magic Records singles
Margaret (singer) songs
Songs written by Margaret (singer)
Songs with lyrics by Thomas Karlsson